Richard Lindsay may refer to:
 Richard Lindsay (West Virginia politician), member of the West Virginia Senate
 Richard P. Lindsay, Utah politician and general authority of the Church of Jesus Christ of Latter-day Saints
 Richard C. Lindsay, United States Air Force general

See also
 Richard Lindsey, member of the Alabama House of Representatives